The men's canoe sprint K-1 1,000 metres at the 2012 Olympic Games in London took place between 6 and 8 August at Eton Dorney.

Competition format

The competition comprised heats, semifinals, and a final round.  The top five boats from each heat, and the fastest loser, advanced to the semifinals.  The top four boats in each semifinal advanced to the "A" final, and competed for medals.  A placing "B" final was held for the other semifinalists.

Schedule

All times are British Summer Time (UTC+01:00)

Results

Heats
The first five and the best 6th placed canoeists qualified for the semifinals.

Heat 1

Heat 2

Heat 3

Semifinals
The fastest four canoeists in each semifinal qualify for the 'A' final (medal race). The slowest four canoeists in each semifinal qualify for the 'B' final (consolation race).

Semifinal 1

Semifinal 2

Finals

Final B

Final A

References

Canoeing at the 2012 Summer Olympics
Men's events at the 2012 Summer Olympics